is a Japanese light novel series written by Keiso. It originated on the novel posting websites Kakuyomu and Shōsetsuka ni Narō, before being acquired by ASCII Media Works, who published the series with illustrations by Kureta under their Dengeki no Shin Bungei imprint. As of February 2023, seven volumes have been released. A manga adaptation with illustrations by Meguri began serialization in Kodansha's Monthly Shōnen Magazine in March 2021. As of December 2021, its chapters have been collected into two volumes. An anime television series adaptation has been announced.

Characters

Media

Light novels
The series is written by Keiso. It originated as a web novel published on the Kakuyomu novel website on June 30, 2017, then also on the Shōsetsuka ni Narō website on July 2, 2017. It was later acquired by ASCII Media Works, who published the series under their Dengeki no Shin Bungei imprint. The first volume was released on September 17, 2019. As of February 2023, seven volumes have been released.

In September 2021, Yen Press announced that it had licensed the series for English publication.

Volume list

Manga
A manga adaptation, illustrated by Meguri, began serialization in Kodansha's Monthly Shōnen Magazine on March 5, 2021. As of December 2021, the individual chapters have been collected into two tankōbon volumes.

Volume list

Anime
An anime television series adaptation was announced on February 12, 2023. The series will be streamed on Disney+.

Reception
Chiriuchi Taniguchi from  offered the series praise, specifically stating it has a great cast of characters and unique storytelling.

In the Kono Light Novel ga Sugoi! guidebook, the series ranked first in the tankōbon in 2021, receiving the most votes for any series in the history of the guidebook.

References

External links
 Light novel official website 
 Manga official website 
 Anime official website 
 

2019 Japanese novels
Adventure anime and manga
Anime and manga based on light novels
Japanese adventure novels
Kodansha manga
Light novels
Light novels first published online
Shōnen manga
Shōsetsuka ni Narō
Upcoming anime television series
Yen Press titles